Nova Lusitania may refer to:
 Nova Lusitânia, Mozambique, currently known as Búzi
 Nova Lusitânia, the original name for the Captaincy of Pernambuco in colonial Brazil

See also
 Nova Luzitânia, a town in the Brazilian state of São Paulo (unrelated to the Captaincy of Pernambuco)